Bowlegs may refer to:

 Bow-leggedness, a leg deformity 
 Bolek (died 1819), a Seminole chieftain from Florida during the First Seminole War
 Billy Bowlegs (1810-1864), a Seminole chieftain during the Second and Third Seminole Wars
 Billy Bowlegs III (1862–1965), a Seminole elder
 William Augustus Bowles or "Billy Bowlegs" (1763–1805), an English adventurer
 Bowlegs, Oklahoma
 Bowlegs Creek, a stream in Florida

See also
Bowleg Bill